Margaret Hayes-Robinson (1876-1930) was a British historian and the head of Royal Holloway's History Department between 1899 and 1911.

Each year since 1992 a lecture series has been held in her honour and guest speakers have included notable historians Richard Overy, Peter Frankopan, Owlen Hufton and Linda Colley. The lecture series is part of the terms of a benefaction made to the department of History at Royal Holloway, University of London.

Life and education 
Margaret Hayes Robinson was born April 7, 1876 to Reverend Richard Hayes Robinson in Bath, England. She later attended the prestigious Cheltenham Ladies' College in Gloucestershire.

In 1898 Hayes-Robinson achieved a first class degree in Modern History at St Hilda's College, Oxford. During her time at Oxford she won the Margaret Evans History Prize in 1896.

Career

It became clear that research was a vital path for any woman seeking an academic post. In recognition of her work, in 1889 Hayes-Robinson was appointed as the Vice-Principal St.Hugh’s College, Oxford. She then moved to Royal Holloway to take up the position of Head of History.

In 1921, Hayes-Robinson was admitted as a tutor to Somersville College, Oxford by Emily Penrose.

Notable tutees include Evelyn Procter and Vera Brittan. Brittan acknowledged Hayes-Robinson in her war diary, Chronicle of Youth.

After Oxford

After her time as a student, Hayes-Robinson became a founding member a society of other students of St Hilda's College, Oxford. She was the first ex-student to then sit on the council of the college.

In 1916, Margaret Hayes-Robinson married Kenneth Leys. They had one daughter. During this time, Hayes-Robinson was working for the War Trade Department of the Board of Trade.

Death

In 1930, Hayes-Robinson was hit by a car while cycling in Hollywell Street, Oxford and died soon after from her injuries.

References

1876 births
1930 deaths
People educated at Cheltenham Ladies' College
Academics of Royal Holloway, University of London
British women historians
20th-century English historians